Leslie 'Les' Zachary Benet (born May 17, 1937) is an influential pharmaceutical scientist heading the UCSF's Benet Lab at the Department of Bioengineering and Therapeutic Sciences and recipient of the Remington Medal for distinguished service to American pharmacy.

Early life and education
Leslie Zachary Benet was born on May 17, 1937 in Cincinnati, Ohio into a family of pharmacists. His father, Jonas and his uncle, Harry, opened Benet's Pharmacies in Cincinnati in the 1930s and in 1942 founded DARA Products, the first drug company to manufacture hypoallergenic dermatologicals.

Benet received his B.A. (English, 1959), B.S. (Pharmacy, 1960), M.S. (Pharmaceutical Chemistry, 1962) from the University of Michigan and Ph.D. (Pharmaceutical Chemistry, 1965) from the University of California.

Academic career
Benet's early work included noncompartmental methods for calculating clearance and volume of distribution. His paper on the volume of distribution is the most highly cited article in the Journal of Pharmaceutical Sciences (cited more than 900 times out of 19,000 articles). In 1986 he was a founder and first president of the American Association of Pharmaceutical Scientists. For over twenty years, Benet chaired the Department of Pharmacy at the UCSF which, under his leadership, became the Department of Biopharmaceutical Sciences. He supervised more than 55
Ph.D. theses and 100 post-doc students. Benet regularly advised the FDA in proposing guidance in the field of bioequivalence. His recent work extended the Biopharmaceutics Classification System, leading to the Biopharmaceutics Drug Disposition Classification System allowing the prediction of enzymes and transporters, transporter-enzyme interplay and transporter-transporter interplay for new molecular entities and drug-drug interactions for already marketed drugs. Benet is listed as one of the "25 Top Pharmacy Professors" in the USA.

Published works
Benet published over 570 articles in peer-reviewed journals, more than 100 book chapters, and seven books.

Honors and awards

Honorary degrees
 Uppsala University, Sweden (Pharm.D., 1987)
 Leiden University, The Netherlands (Ph.D., 1995)
 University of Illinois at Chicago (D.Sc., 1997)
 Philadelphia College of Pharmacy and Science (D.Sc., 1997)
 Long Island University (D.Sc., 1999)
 University of Athens, Greece (Ph.D., 2005)
 Catholic University of Leuven, Belgium (Ph.D., 2010)
 University of Michigan (D.Sc., 2011)
 University of Lisbon, Portugal (Ph.D., 2016)

Scientific/professional honors and awards
 Distinguished Alumnus Award (University of Michigan College of Pharmacy, 1982)
 Research Achievement Award in Pharmaceutics (Academy of Pharmaceutical Sciences, 1982)
 Distinguished Service Award (ACCP, 1988)
 Distinguished Scientist Award (AAPS, 1989)
 Rho Chi Society Lecture Award (The Rho Chi Society, 1990)
 Volwiler Distinguished Research Achievement Award (AACP, 1991)
 Distinguished Service Profile Award (American Foundation for Pharmaceutical Education, 1993)
 Rawls-Palmer Progress in Medicine Award (American Society for Clinical Pharmacology and Therapeutics, 1995)
 Distinguished Service Award (AAPS, 1996)
 Takeru Higuchi Research Prize (APhA, 2000)
 Wurster Research Award in Pharmaceutics (AAPS, 2000)
 Høst-Madsen Medal (FIP, 2001)
 Research Achievement Award in Pharmaceutical Sciences (Pharmaceutical Sciences World Congress, 2004)
 Career Achievement Award in Oral Drug Delivery (Controlled Release Society, 2004)
 Paul Ehrlich Magic-Bullet Lifetime Achievement Award (Nürnberg, Germany, 2008)
 Oscar B. Hunter Memorial Award in Therapeutics (American Society for Clinical Pharmacology and Therapeutics, 2010)
 Distinguished Investigator Award (ACCP, 2011)
 APhA-APRS Ebert Prize (American Pharmacists Association – Academy of Pharmaceutical Research and Science, 2013)
 North American Scientific Achievement Award (International Society for the Study of Xenobiotics, 2015)
 Remington Medal (2016)

Teaching awards
 Academic Senate Distinguished Teaching Award (UCSF, 1973)
 Long Teaching Award for Excellence in Teaching (UCSF School of Pharmacy, 1990)
 Outstanding Faculty Mentorship Award (UCSF Graduate Division, 2001 and 2016)

References

External links

American pharmacists
American pharmacologists
1937 births
Living people
University of California, San Francisco faculty
University of California, San Francisco alumni
People from Cincinnati
University of Michigan alumni
Members of the National Academy of Medicine